Franciszek Błażyca ([]; 30 September 1887 – 1940) was a Silesian Voivodeship Police Commander, one of the victims of the Katyn massacre.

Life 
He was born in Suszec as the son of Jan and Karolina Kwok. From 1919 to 1921, he was a member of the Polish Military Organisation of Upper Silesia, and took part in the Silesian Uprisings. From 24 June 1922, he was a member of the Silesian Provincial Police, service number 1470. He served in the Świętochłowice, and in September 1939 in the Lipiny Police Station.

After the USSR's aggression against Poland in 1939, he found himself in Soviet captivity in a special NKVD camp in Ostashkov. He was murdered by the NKVD in spring 1940 as one of the victims of Katyn massacre. He was buried in Miednoje.

In 1948, Paulina Błażyca, not knowing the fate of her husband, sent a letter dated March 14, 1948, to the Polish Embassy in Moscow requesting the release of Franciszek Błażyca from a camp.

Posthumous promotion and commemoration 
On October 4, 2007, Franciszek Błażyca was posthumously promoted to the rank of State Police aspirant.

Orders 

 Cross of Valour
 Cross of Independence
 Cross of Merit
 Cross on the Silesian Ribbon of Valour and Merit
 Commemorative Medal for the War of 1918-1921
 Decennial Medal of Regained Independence
 Upper Silesian Star

References

Bibliography 

 Miednoje. Księga Cmentarna Polskiego Cmentarza Wojennego, tom I, Warsaw 2005, str. 51.

External links 

 Photographs of Franciszek Błażyca in the collection of the Silesian Digital Library sbc.org.pl

1887 births
1940 deaths
Katyn massacre victims
People from Silesian Voivodeship
Polish police officers